Aero Caribbean Flight 883 was a domestic scheduled passenger service from Port-au-Prince, Haiti to Havana, Cuba with a stopover in Santiago de Cuba. On 4 November 2010, the ATR 72 operating the route crashed in the central Cuban province of Sancti Spíritus, killing all 61 passengers and 7 crew members aboard. Along with American Eagle Flight 4184 it was the worst crash in ATR 72 history until Yeti Airlines Flight 691 crashed 12 years later killing 72 passengers and crew.

Accident
The aircraft departed Santiago de Cuba en route to Havana around 16:50 local time (20:50 UTC). It was the last flight out of Santiago de Cuba airport before it was closed because of the approach of Hurricane Tomas. Witnesses said the plane was "flying low and appeared unstable ... pouring out smoke and fire", before hearing an explosion.

Medical facilities in Guasimal were put on alert to prepare for emergency patients. However, by midnight they were told to stand down as no survivors were expected.

Aircraft
The aircraft involved was a twin-turboprop ATR 72-212 with Cuban registration CU-T1549, in use with Cuba-based Aero Caribbean since . It was delivered from the production line in 1995 to its first owner, Simmons Airlines and also with Continental Express as the second one. According to the manufacturer, the plane had accumulated almost 25,000 flight hours in more than 34,500 flights. Aero Caribbean was wholly owned by the government of Cuba.

Passengers and crew
The passengers and crew were of the following nationalities:

Search and recovery
In order to allow access to the crash site, rescue workers had to use bulldozers to plow through thick vegetation. The aircraft was completely destroyed by the impact and resulting explosion, and all the victims' bodies were badly burned. Investigators believe that the passengers had no time to react because all bodies were found in their own seats, which helped investigators with identifications. The wreckage burned for hours after the crash. The recovered bodies were to be sent to Cuba's Institute of Legal Medicine for identification.

The day after the crash, on 5 November, rescue workers recovered the flight data and cockpit voice recorders. They were turned over to investigators for inspection and analysis.

Reactions
Argentine President Cristina Fernández de Kirchner sent a plane with relatives of the victims to bring home the bodies. Spanish Prime Minister José Luis Rodríguez Zapatero, South African President Jacob Zuma, Polish President Bronisław Komorowski and French Foreign Minister Bernard Kouchner, in a message addressing Cuban Foreign Affairs Minister Eduardo Rodriguez Parrilla, all sent condolences.

Investigation
The Civil Aviation Institute of Cuba (IACC) investigated the accident with assistance from aircraft manufacturer ATR and the French Bureau of Enquiry and Analysis for Civil Aviation Safety (BEA).

In December 2010, the IACC stated that the analysis of the flight recorders did not highlight any technical problem with the ATR 72.

See also
American Eagle Flight 4184, TransAsia Airways Flight 791, and West Wind Aviation Flight 280, other ATR 72's that crashed due to icing.
Aero Trasporti Italiani Flight 460, an ATR-42 that crashed due to icing in Italy.

References

External links
Aftermath of the crash from Associated Press Archive

2010 in Cuba
Airliner accidents and incidents caused by ice
Aviation accidents and incidents in 2010
Aviation accidents and incidents in Cuba
Accidents and incidents involving the ATR 72
Sancti Spíritus
November 2010 events in North America